The Bank im Bistum Essen eG (BIB) is a cooperative bank which was founded in 1966. The bank is located in Essen and is focused on a specifically defined clientele. These include the Catholic Church and its institutions. Its members are business clients like hospitals, foundations, church-related housing construction, homes for disabled people, retirement homes and other institutions of provision – as well as a number of private customers: staff members of the institutions mentioned above. By now people who do not work for the church can also become customers as well as atheists or people of other religions. Due to the bank's ethic sustainability orientation, numerous customers from the charitable-foundations-field have joined the bank in recent years. Companies that are solely profit oriented are, according to the bank, not part of the bank's customer base.

The BIB is as well as the Bank für Kirche und Caritas eG in Paderborn, the DKM Darlehnskasse Münster and the Pax-Bank in Cologne one of the four catholic church banks in North Rhine-Westphalia. Measured by the bank's total assets in 2016 the Bank im Bistum Essen makes place 21 on the list of the largest cooperative banks in Germany.

The bank offers the whole range of services of a universal bank.

Business orientation
The actions of the BIB are focused on the idea of sustainable development. The bank describes its business orientation with the slogan FairBanking. The slogan means to describe the connection between economic, social and environmental responsibility. The Christian principle, to preserve creation, is routed in the bank's strategy.

Range of services
The bank's services include:
 Financing of social properties like hospitals and care homes
 Financing of housing construction 
 Deployment of electronic bank services
 Asset management from savings accounts through to investments in special funds in due consideration of ethic sustainability aspects

Sustainability and social responsibility
According to the bank sustainability is part of the business policy of the Bank im Bistum Essen Environmental impacts of the bank's business activities are being measured in an internal Life-cycle assessment. Goal of the life cycle assessment is to improve operating numbers for "electricity", "heating energy", "paper", "water" and "waste" permanently, to make an appropriate contribution toward environmental protection. In addition, all of the bank's own investments are to be invested according to ethic-social criteria. The bank's product range is constantly updated with sustainable products. This includes ethic-sustainable managed funds as well as the initiation and the management of microfinance funds.

The bank's foundation Kirche und Caritas supports regional, national and international projects.

Microfinance
Since 2006, the bank offers loans worldwide to microfinance institutions. Apart from this the bank has launched two microfinance funds for institutional investors in which the bank itself invested as well and which is managed by the bank itself. The Bank im Bistum Essen eG. is the first credit institution in Germany that offers private customers the possibility to invest into the microfinance sector via a passbook.

References

External links
 Official Website

Banks of Germany
Companies based in Essen
Microfinance banks
Catholic Church and finance
1966 establishments in Germany